Cane Creek is a stream in the U.S. state of Indiana.

Cane Creek was so named from the wild cane which grew abundantly there.

See also
List of rivers of Indiana

References

Rivers of Dubois County, Indiana
Rivers of Orange County, Indiana
Rivers of Indiana